Muzi Bon (also Romanized as Mūzī Bon) is a village in Rudpey-ye Jonubi Rural District, in the Central District of Sari County, Mazandaran Province, Iran. At the 2006 census, its population was 246, in 65 families.

References 

Populated places in Sari County